Caddo National Grassland is a national grassland in the southern Great Plains, consisting of two separate sections located in northeastern and southeastern Fannin County, Texas, United States. It is a  protected area that was purchased in the 1930s. The goal of the park when purchased was to restore the eroded soil. The grassland is divided into two units: Bois d'Arc Creek and Ladonia.

The grassland is administered together with all four United States national forests and two national grasslands located entirely in Texas, from common offices in Lufkin, Texas. The units include Angelina, Davy Crockett, Sabine, and Sam Houston National Forests, plus Caddo and Lyndon B. Johnson National Grassland. The local ranger district offices are located in Decatur.

References

External links

Caddo-LBJ National Grasslands- U.S. Forest Service
Caddo National Grasslands WMA - Texas Parks and Wildlife Department

Grasslands of Texas
Grasslands of the North American Great Plains
Protected areas of Fannin County, Texas
National Grasslands of the United States
Wildlife management areas of Texas